Gaduk Boneh-ye Pir (also Romanized as Gadūk Boneh-ye Pīr; also known as Boneh Pīr and Boneh-ye Pīr) is a village in Bahmai-ye Garmsiri-ye Shomali Rural District, Bahmai-ye Garmsiri District, Bahmai County, Kohgiluyeh and Boyer-Ahmad Province, Iran. At the 2006 census, its population was 56, in 10 families.

References 

Populated places in Bahmai County